Buck Page (June 18, 1922 — August 21, 2006) founded the first western band known as Riders of the Purple Sage.

Page, a native of Pittsburgh, Pennsylvania, began performing on local radio at age 11. He played string bass and rhythm guitar for a western band, The Valley Ranch Boys.

Two years later he formed a staff band for Pittsburgh radio station KDKA that he named Riders of the Purple Sage after the title of the Zane Grey novel. Riders of the Purple Sage performed five hour-long shows a week on KDKA from 1936–1938.

The band later moved to New York City and performed on radio station WOR and at a nightclub, Village Barn.

Page served in the U.S. Navy during World War II. During the war another western band using the name Riders of the Purple Sage was organized in California by singer Foy Willing. Page moved to the West Coast in the 1950s. He and Willing eventually met and the two men formed a lifelong friendship.

Page, who could play 21 instruments, worked as a studio musician in California. He played guitar on the original recording of the theme song for the NBC western series Bonanza and also served as background musician for the TV shows Wagon Train and Laramie. According to Bob Bain, however, the only one of the four guitarists on the Bonanza theme recording still living, Page was not one of the guitarists on that session.

In the late 1950s, Page lived in Hesperia, California where he owned and ran a restaurant.  He also rodeoed in the summer circuit, traveling with rodeo champion Eddy Akridge.

In the 1960s Page worked for the Baldwin Piano Company and helped engineers develop the Supersound amplifier.

Page received the Country/Western Living Legend Award from the North American Country Music Associations International in 2001. His first solo recording, Right Place to Start, was released on CD in December 2005.

Page's last public concert was in July 2006 in Scottsdale, Arizona, where he performed before a crowd of several thousand people during a National Day of the Cowboy celebration.

Page died in his apartment at the Burbank Senior Artists Colony in Burbank, California. His death was attributed to natural causes.

Background

The first "original" Riders of the Purple Sage was formed in circa 1932 by Jack Dalton and was disbanded after a couple of years.  When Buck Page's group was appearing at the Village Barn in New York, they were advertised as the "Sons of the Purple Sage."  According to Sharon Lee Willing, Foy Willing's widow and author of "No One to Cry To," his biography, Foy and Buck Page never met.  Although Foy disbanded his group in 1952 it was temporary; he never relinquished the name and periodically reorganized and recorded his Riders of the Purple Sage until his death, July 24, 1978.

References
 McLellan, Dennis. (2006, Sept. 2). Buck Page, 84; Singer Founded the Original Riders of the Purple Sage. The Los Angeles Times

1922 births
2006 deaths
Musicians from Pittsburgh
American country guitarists
American male guitarists
People from Hesperia, California
20th-century American guitarists
Guitarists from Pennsylvania
Country musicians from Pennsylvania
20th-century American male musicians
United States Navy personnel of World War II